Atavism is the fifth studio album released by the American heavy metal band Slough Feg (formerly The Lord Weird Slough Feg).  A vinyl edition was also produced by Forest Moon Special Products in a limited print of 500. The title of the album: atavism, is the tendency to revert to ancestral type. In biology, an atavism is an evolutionary throwback, such as traits reappearing which had disappeared generations before. Thus the appearance of primordial humans in a cave on the cover.

Track listing

References

External links 
Album entry at Encyclopaedia Metallum

2005 albums
Slough Feg albums
Science fiction albums